The uniforms of the Canadian Armed Forces are the official dress worn by members of Canada's military while on duty.

Prior to the unification of the Canadian Armed Forces, the uniforms of the Canadian Army, Royal Canadian Air Force (RCAF) and Royal Canadian Navy (RCN) were similar to their counterparts in the forces of the United Kingdom and other Commonwealth countries, save for national identifiers and some regimental accoutrements. With the unification of the Canadian Forces in 1968, all service branches began to wear Canadian Forces rifle green uniforms. Distinctive Environmental Uniforms (DEUs) for the various branches of the Canadian Forces was introduced in the late 1980s, and are generally similar to their pre-unification uniforms.

Numbered Orders of Dress

No. 1 (Ceremonial) Dress
Full formal dress uniforms for ceremonial parades and other special occasions.

 No. 1 (Accoutrements): Service Dress (see below) uniform with medals and ceremonial accoutrements (swords, white web belts, gloves, etc.).
 No. 1A (Medals Only): Service Dress uniform with medals, but no ceremonial accoutrements.
 No. 1B (Full Dress): Regimental full dress (such as scarlet tunics and bearskin hats of Guards regiments). Regimental uniforms are normally not provided at public expense; purchase of these uniforms is done either by individuals or by various regiments out of non-public funds.
 No. 1C (Semi-Ceremonial): Patrol dress (a slightly less elaborate regimental uniform) or the Navy high-collared white jacket.
 No. 1D (Undress Ribbons): No. 1C worn with ribbons instead of medals.

No. 2 (Mess) Dress

Formal evening attire for mess dinners. Mess dress is not provided at public expense; however, all commissioned officers of the Regular Force are required to own mess dress within six months of being commissioned.

 No. 2 (Mess Standard): Full mess kit with mess jackets, cummerbunds or waistcoats, etc.
 No. 2A (Mess White): No. 2 with summer white jacket.
 No. 2B (Mess Service): No. 3 with white dress shirt and bow tie; worn by CF members who do not own No. 2 mess dress.
 No. 2C (Mess Shipboard): No. 3B with a cummerbund and without ribbons or name tag; worn as evening wear on board ship. Sometimes called Red Sea rig.
 No. 2D (CAF Mess Standard): Air Force members are permitted to continue wearing the unified CAF pattern of mess dress.

No. 3 (Service) Dress

Also called a "walking-out" or "duty uniform", it is the military equivalent of the business suit; it is the standard uniform for appearing in public (hence the moniker "walking-out dress"). No 3 Service Dress becomes No 2B Mess Dress by replacing the shirt and tie with a white shirt and bow tie, or to No 1 Ceremonial Dress by the addition of ceremonial web or sword belts, gloves, and other accoutrements.

 No. 3 (Duty Service): Tunic and necktie, with medal ribbons.
 No. 3A (Long-Sleeved Shirt): No. 3 with jacket removed; worn only indoors, within DND buildings.
 No. 3B (Short-Sleeved Shirt): Short-sleeved shirt, without tunic or tie; worn during the summer on less formal occasions.
 No. 3C (Sweater): Shirt and sweater, with or without a tie; worn in place of No. 3B in cooler weather.
 No. 3D (Tropical): Alternative tan uniform with optional shorts; worn in tropical climates.

No. 4 (Base) Dress
"Work dress", as it was commonly known, was a more informal uniform, originally for day-to-day wear in garrison or on base, out of the public eye. It usually consisted of work trousers and either a dress shirt or work shirt, with an optional sweater; Army personnel wore a disruptive-pattern jacket.

The Canadian Army later replaced work dress with "No. 4 (Garrison) Dress", which consisted of the old-style work dress pants, a disruptive-pattern jacket, a black web belt, a short-sleeve summer Service Dress shirt with the collar open and over the jacket collar, and high paratrooper-style garrison boots. The rifle-green crew-neck combat sweater doubled as a sweater for wear with Service Dress and Garrison Dress. Due to concerns over the number of uniforms Army personnel had to carry with them on postings and taskings, the tan summer DEU was eventually retired, and the winter uniform mandated for year-round wear. The garrison dress uniform was not popular with the combat arms, as the boots were easily scuffed, especially when doing manual labour; the jacket was heavily lined and restrictive; the belt was designed to ride very high on the body and served no practical purpose. Army troops generally eschewed garrison dress for the combat uniform when possible, even in garrison. Land Force Western Area actually instructed its units to wear the combat uniform instead, and Land Force Command later adopted the practice across the rest of the country, authorizing combat uniform for all occasions where garrison dress was deemed appropriate.

Work dress and the Army garrison dress have been phased out; No. 5 dress (for the army) and No. 3 (for the air force and navy) were adapted to replace it.

No. 5 (Operational) Dress

Operational dress uniforms are designed for wear in combat conditions. They are intended to be adjusted for comfort and practicality; therefore only naval combat dress has lettered variants. With the elimination of work/garrison dress, operational dress uniforms are now commonly worn whenever service dress is impractical.

 Naval Combat Dress (NCD): Worn by all RCN shipboard personnel. Consists of black trousers and jacket with a blue shirt, made of Nomex for fire protection and designed for wear by ships' crews.
 No. 5: full NCD, including jacket
 No. 5A: No. 5 without jacket
 No. 5B: No. 5A with sleeves rolled
 No. 5D (tropical shipboard): No. 5B with shorts and knee socks in place of regular trousers. Worn only aboard ship in hot climates.
 Field combat clothing: Worn by all army and air force personnel, as well as navy personnel assigned to army or air force units. The CAF combat uniform consists of loose-fitting Canadian Disruptive Pattern (CADPAT) shirt and trousers and is designed to be worn in the field or for working around aircraft. This uniform is usually referred to simply as CADPAT.
 Flying clothing: Green flying suits are worn by CAF aircrew.

Distinctive Environmental Uniforms

Although the Canadian Armed Forces are a single service, the respective environmental commands are issued Distinctive Environmental Uniforms (DEU) unique to each command. Commands with their own DEUs include the Canadian Army, Royal Canadian Air Force, Royal Canadian Navy, and Special Operations Forces Branch. While DEU refers to all the different environmental uniforms used by the forces, in colloquial usage it refers to what is formally known as "No. 3 (Service) Dress".

History
Shortly after the armed services of Canada were unified into the Canadian Armed Forces, the service-specific uniforms (navy blue, khaki, and light blue) were abandoned in favour of the Canadian Forces rifle green, single-breasted, four-button tunic and pants, with beret or service cap uniform, commonly referred to as "CFs" or "CF greens". Though accommodation was made for army regiments' ceremonial dress uniforms, no allowance was made for the Navy or Air Force, with the exception of a rifle-green wedge cap for optional wear by the latter. The traditional Navy and Air Force rank names were replaced by the army equivalents, with naval-style rank badges for officers and army-style for non-commissioned members. Navy rank names were restored a few years later.  However, the Air Force retains what had formerly been considered "army" rank (but which is similar to that used by the air forces of many other nations).

For everyday work wear, in environments or occasions where the CF greens would not be appropriate, personnel were issued the Work Dress uniform. This consisted of rifle-green work trousers; a zippered rifle-green work jacket; a "lagoon green" work shirt; and beret. The jacket collar was worn open; the shirt was either worn with a tie, or with the collar open and over the jacket collar. For a brief period in the 1980s, ascots or dickeys in regimental or branch colours were worn inside the open shirt collar. Army field units normally wore combat boots with work dress, "blousing" the trousers with elastic boot bands. Many Army regiments wore regimental shoulder flashes on the work dress jacket.

A notable exception was the Special Service Force (SSF), who wore a camouflage jump smock, regimental T-shirt, beret, and high-top paratrooper boots, with work dress or combat trousers as applicable.

DEU were issued to the CF beginning in 1986. Members of the sea, land and air forces were issued uniforms distinctive to their service or "environment". Officers' and non-commissioned members' uniforms are identical, differing only in insignia and accoutrements. In 2017 a fourth pattern of DEU was created for the Special Operations Forces Branch.

Ceremonial dress

Ceremonial dress uniforms include elaborate traditional full dress or undress uniforms, that may be purchased by individuals or their units. Full dress uniforms (No. 1B ceremonial dress) are worn by the Canadian Army, RCAF pipe bands, and cadets of the Royal Military College of Canada. Undress (or patrol dress) uniforms (No. 1D ceremonial dress) are worn by the Royal Military College of Canada, reserve force combat arms regiments, Navy personnel and Air Force pipe bands.

Although the distinctive elemental service dress uniforms are primarily used as duty uniforms, the uniform is also used as a ceremonial dress uniform when worn with ceremonial accoutrements and medals (No. 1 ceremonial dress). The uniform without accoutrements is referred to as No. 1A ceremonial dress. The uniforms may be worn for ceremonial occasions by all units which do not have full dress, or when full dress is not appropriate.

Canadian Army 
The Canadian Army's universal full dress uniforms includes a scarlet tunic, midnight blue trousers with a  scarlet trouser stripe. The scarlet tunic includes white pipings, and the unit's facing colours on the tunic's collar, and shoulder strap. The tunic's sleeve also has a trefoil-shaped Austrian knot embroidered on the exterior cuff. The authorized headgear for the universal full dress uniform is a white Wolseley helmet. A white ceremonial belt is also authorized for ceremonial wear.

Although the Canadian Army maintains a universal design for its ceremonial dress, many regiments in the Canadian Army are authorized regimental differences from the universal full dress pattern, including some armoured units, Scottish regiments, and all artillery, and Voltigeur/rifle regiments. Authorized regimental differences for headgear include a bearskin cap for foot guards and fusiliers, a busby for rifles/Voltigeurs (excluding Les Voltigeurs de Québec, which uses a shako), a feather bonnet for Scottish regiments, and several different authorized headgears for armoured regiments. A number of regiments are also authorized to wear different brass buckles on their belts, bearing the badge of their respective regiments.

Most of the Canadian Army's ceremonial embellishments emerged from a simplified system ordered by the Monarch of Canada in 1902, and later promulgated in the Canadian Militia Dress Regulations 1907, and Militia Order No. 58/1908 for non-commissioned officer.

Regular Force regiments 
The following regular force regiments have authorized full dress (No. 1B).

Reserve Force regiments 
The following reserve force regiments have authorized full dress (No. 1B) and undress (Nos. 1C and 1D, also known as patrol dress) uniforms.

Royal Canadian Air Force 

Full dress uniforms for units of the RCAF include a blue tunic, and blue trousers and facings. Air Force pipe bands are the only RCAF units authorized to wear full-dress uniform.

History 
From 1925 to 1940, full dress was authorized for all commissioned officers of the RCAF. It was optional for all officers when first introduced, and from 1 August 1935 was mandatory only after five year's paid service in the Permanent Active Air Force or on substantive promotion to the rank of flight lieutenant. On 30 August 1940, the wear of full dress and mess dress was "suspended for the duration of hostilities". Full dress was subsequently removed from the RCAF dress regulations in 1944 and, unlike mess dress, was not re-introduced following the end of the Second World War.

Royal Canadian Navy 
Full dress for members of the RCN includes a navy blue tunic and trousers with white facings, although the Canadian Forces dress instructions state that naval full dress is no longer issued. The Navy undress uniform is the only undress uniform usually purchased by individuals, and consists of a high-collared white jacket, worn with issued white DEU trousers. Nos 1 (Accoutrements), 1A, and 2B in the forces' order of dress are based on the command's service dress uniform.

Royal Military College of Canada 
 
At the Royal Military College of Canada, cadets wear a variety of badges, depending on their proficiency and rank. The gold thread crossed pistols are awarded as a military badge for marksmanship when marksman levels are achieved for the pistol; a crown is awarded in May to the top score in the college. The gold thread cross swords in a laurel wreath military proficiency badge is awarded if the following conditions have been met by the student: a mark of at least B in military assessment; positive leadership qualities in the summer training report; an academic average of at least 70%; a mark of at least B in physical training; a satisfactory mark in the bilingualism profile; A crown is awarded to the top cadet having received this award, by year. Students are awarded a blue maple leaf for the minimum bilingual profile standard of BBB. If they achieve higher bilingual proficiency, they receive a silver or gold maple leaf. An academic distinction badge is awarded to a student with an academic average of at least 80% at the end of the year. Physical fitness badges are awarded upon reaching a certain number of points.

As cadets learn and demonstrate leadership skills, they are appointed to different positions. The number of bars increases from zero to five as students are promoted.

There are 5 no-bar positions and 15 two-bar positions. The brass or gold thread lyre is awarded as a proficiency badge for brass and reed by the band officer when a student is considered capable of participating in parades.  A brass or gold treble clef is awarded by the band officer as a proficiency badge for choir when a student is considered to be ready for concerts. A brass or gold thread pipe is awarded by the band officer as a proficiency badge for pipes when a student is considered capable of participating in parades. A brass or gold thread drum is awarded as a proficiency badge for drums by the band officer when a student is considered capable of participating in parades. The brass or gold thread thistle is awarded by the band officer as a proficiency badge for Scottish highland dance when a student is considered capable of participating in parades.

Mess dress

Mess dress uniforms are traditional military evening wear purchased by individual members. Regular force officers are required to purchase mess dress within 6 months of being commissioned. Non-commissioned members and reserve force officers may purchase mess dress or wear the issued DEU (see ) uniform with a white shirt and bow tie (No. 2B dress). The Navy, Army, and Air Force each have unique patterns of mess dress. Within the Army, each personnel branch has its own pattern with authorized differences from the standard Army pattern; most armoured and infantry regiments have further differences from their standard branch patterns. Women may wear trousers or a long skirt.

Service dress
Each environment is assigned a distinctive "duty uniform," known as service dress, or No. 3 Dress.

The service dress uniform consists of an environmental pattern jacket, long- or short-sleeved dress shirt, necktie, trousers (skirt optional for women), and black oxfords or ankle boots. Jackets, trousers, skirts, neckties, sweaters (for No. 3C), scarves, raincoats, overcoat, and parkas are in the specific environmental colours of navy blue (actually black) for the navy, rifle green for the army, air force blue for the air force, and olive green for the special operations branch; shirts are white, linden green, light blue, and tan, respectively.

Navy 

Naval personnel are issued a "navy blue" (actually a tone of black according to Canadian Forces Dress Instructions) six-on-three double-breasted jacket and trousers, white shirt, and white peaked cap. For the summer periods Navy personnel may wear white trousers, a white web belt for the trousers, and white socks and shoes with No. 3B dress. These white items may also be worn with a privately purchased high-collared white tunic for No. 1C or 1D dress.

Army

Army personnel are issued new tunics and trousers similar in style to the old CF greens, but with the addition of shoulder straps. They were originally issued in heavyweight rifle green (worn with the old CF green dress shirt) for winter wear, and lighter-weight tan for summer; in the latter case, headgear, neckties, belts and badges were still rifle-green or on rifle-green backing. Only the Army retained the branch or regimental collar badges on the dress jacket, such non-traditional devices having been abandoned on Navy and Air Force jackets. Army personnel were also issued epaulettes that could be sewn to the old CF green service dress tunic to convert it into a "new" DEU tunic. The tan summer uniform was discontinued in the mid-1990s in favour of the green uniform to address complaints of soldiers needing to maintain multiple uniforms.

Beginning in the 1990s, the peaked service cap was phased out for Army personnel with the exceptions of certain reserve regiments (e.g. Canadian Grenadier Guards), instructors of the Royal Regiment of Canadian Artillery School at Gagetown, and as an optional item for wear by general officers, with the beret (except in Scottish and Highland regiments) issued as the universal Army headgear for service dress. More recently, the heavy combat sweater was retired, replaced with a lighter-weight V-neck sweater for service dress wear, and with a fleece sweatshirt for operational wear.

Air Force 

Personnel in the Air Force are issued a uniform of a similar cut to the old CF greens, but in blue, with a light-blue shirt, black necktie, and air force blue wedge cap. Air personnel were also issued a blue beret for wear when appropriate; it was soon authorized as was the blue flyer's jacket and Gore-Tex "line" jackets for use with work dress, then with service dress. When the blue uniform was introduced, the rank insignia and buttons retained the gold colour used by the CF greens. In 2015, this was changed to pearl grey rank insignia and silver buttons.

Special Operations Forces
In 2017 the Special Operations Forces Branch began to wear DEUs that are distinct from the Navy, Army, and Air Force. The uniform consists of a dark olive five-button jacket, light olive trousers bloused over black jump boots, light khaki shirt and olive tie, and a tan beret.

Purple trades
For military occupations that are not specifically designated to a particular environment (e.g. administrators, military police, medical personnel, etc.), an environment is usually assigned or may be requested on enrolment. Due to the way that members of these "purple trades" frequently have environments different from their current assignments, many units, when in ceremonial, service or mess dress, will display a mix of Navy, Army, and Air Force uniforms. As various specialty courses become more widely available, no longer restricted only to "soldiers" or "sailors", for example, it is not unheard-of to see a Navy HRA/FSA in a tactical air squadron with parachutist's wings, or an Air Force medic in a tank regiment with a submariner's "dolphins" badge.

Operational dress

Originally specialized uniforms for wear in an operational (i.e. combat) theatre, operational dress uniforms have now superseded No 4 uniform for everyday wear in garrison. The operational dress uniforms are naval combat dress (NCD) for the Navy, CADPAT "field combat clothing" for the Army and Air Force, and olive green "flying clothing" for aircrew.

Combat clothing
Canadian Forces presently use Canadian Disruptive Pattern (CADPAT) camouflage on their combat uniforms, replacing the olive-green-coloured combat uniform between 1997 and the mid-2000s. CADPAT camouflaged clothing items include shirts, pants, raingear, parkas, and fleece sweaters. CADPAT uniforms are worn by army and air force personnel (as well as navy personnel attached to army or air force units) as operational dress.

CADPAT Temperate Woodland (TW) is a primarily green pattern worn in Canada and in similar environments overseas, while CADPAT Arid Regions (AR) is worn only on deployments to desert regions (such as Afghanistan). For winter conditions, personnel were issued white mukluks, mitts, and balaclavas, as well as white camouflage covers for their parkas, trousers, helmets, and rucksacks. Lightweight coats, rain suits, parkas, and other tactical clothing (in OD) is also issued to deal with different weather conditions.

History
Until the early 1960s, the Army battle dress uniform was worn both on parades and in combat. It was common to maintain traditional regimental distinctions, even in the thick of battle. A notable exception to this was the Highland regiments, who were ordered to cease wearing their kilts in 1939 in favour of more generic service dress, the kilt being deemed "unsuitable for modern war".

By the time of the Korean War, more comfortable combat clothing was being designed, notably "bush dress", in dark-green cotton and bearing a resemblance to the khaki drill uniform of the Second World War.  Lightweight service dress known as "T-dubs" were issued for parades in the summer months.

In the early 1960s, battle dress was replaced for field wear by the combat uniform, often referred to merely as "combats". It was issued as a standard order of dress for the pre-Unification Army, and later Regular Force "army" personnel in field units of Force Mobile Command and for personnel in field units or detachments in Canadian Forces Communication Command, as well as for personnel in other organizations as required for employment in a land combat environment. Combat uniforms were not issued to reservists until 1972, although they were permitted to wear it if they purchased it themselves (usually at war surplus stores).

The combat uniform consisted of a long-sleeve olive-drab (OD) shirt, with two voluminous cargo pockets at the hip and two slanted pockets (designed for the 20-round FNC1 rifle magazine) at the breast, and drawstrings at the waist and hem; OD trousers, with regular pockets at the front and back and a large cargo patch pocket on each thigh, drawstrings at the cuff, and buttons on the belt loops for the attachment of optional suspenders; an OD V-neck undershirt; and black combat boots, with trouser cuffs bloused over. The beret was often worn, but could be replaced by a soft OD field hat or the American M1 helmet as the tactical situation dictated (while the Canadian combat uniform was universally olive green, American-style cloth helmet covers where two types of camouflage pattern were issued; a reversible  "Mitchill" pattern consisting of a spring pattern and an autumn pattern sewn on the reverse and later the American woodland pattern).  At the time of adoption, the OD colour was a standard among NATO forces; however, as other NATO forces adopted camouflage uniforms (for example, the British DPM (disruptive-pattern material) uniforms, or the Americans their woodland camouflage BDUs (battle dress uniforms)), the Canadian Forces quickly became one of the few first-world militaries not to adopt camouflage garments.

In the late 1980s, the CF experimented with an alternative combat shirt designed by an Air Command officer. The Mark III Combat Shirt had flat breast pockets and lacked the hip cargo pockets and drawstrings. It was designed to be tucked into the trousers like a regular shirt if desired, or worn untucked like the older-style shirt. It proved rather unpopular from an operational standpoint due to its lack of storage capacity, and was considered to look sloppier than the older style; few were issued after initial stocks were depleted, but the Mark III was worn alongside the earlier marks by some individuals until the adoption of CADPAT throughout the Army in the late 1990s. Earlier uniforms remain in use in small numbers by the Canadian Cadets youth programs, and are issued at summer training facilities to junior cadets for survival exercises.

Officers displayed their rank on slip-ons on the epaulettes of the shirt or jacket; non-commissioned members wore small OD versions of their rank insignia stitched in the centre of the upper sleeve, although for a period in the 1980s these were stitched onto slip-ons, ostensibly to save wear-and-tear on the uniforms, but also providing the ability to remove rank for security purposes. The national identifier consisted of a "CANADA" flash stitched on the upper shoulder just below the sleeve seam, and unit or trade identifiers were worn on slip-ons on the shirt's epaulettes; however, personnel belonging to Canadian Forces Europe and other overseas missions wore full-colour Canadian flag patches on the upper sleeve. In the 1990s, the "CANADA" flash was replaced with a subdued olive-drab Canadian flag, worn on the upper left sleeve below the epaulette. These flag badges showed up in full-colour red and white when illuminated by a blue light.

Flying suit
Canadian Armed Forces aircrew wear green flying suits as operational dress. The two-piece flying suit (originally worn only by tactical helicopter crews) and the one-piece coverall flying suit are worn interchangeably by most CF aircrew. Prior to the mid-2000s, the one-piece flying suit was blue and worn by all fixed-wing aircrew.

Naval combat dress

RCN personnel wear naval combat dress (NCD) as operational dress. NCD consists of a blue shirt, black pants, and black jacket or parka for colder weather. Originally designed for wear on board ship, naval combat dress is made of Nomex.

Occupational Dress
Various types of special working uniforms are worn by military police, medical personnel, dental personnel, cooks, chaplains, firefighters, stewards, and brass-reed musicians. Unlike operational dress, occupational dress uniforms are worn only by personnel actively engaged in designated tasks. Within the CAF Dress Instructions, maternity dress is also grouped in this category of "occupational, health, and safety dress".

Maternity dress
When conventional pattern uniforms are no longer comfortable or aesthetically appropriate, a pregnant woman can wear maternity dress. The non-operational maternity dress is a common-pattern ensemble in light-weight, washable material in three environmental colours. There is also
a white occupational variant for medical, dental, and food services personnel, worn as well by navy personnel during the summer dress period. The ensemble consists of general-purpose items suitable for wear as alternatives to those of service dress and its ceremonial and mess derivatives. Medals and accoutrements may be worn on ceremonial dress occasions. The ensemble includes a long tunic, a short tunic, slacks, maternity shirts in both long and short sleeve, a light jacket and a maternity top-coat with a removable liner.

Military police

After unification, Canadian Forces Military Police (MPs) wore the same uniforms as other personnel, distinguished only by a few unique accoutrements: a white vinyl cover over the service cap, a gold-coloured police-style badge on the breast pocket, and/or a brassard or armlet bearing the title "MP" or "MILITARY POLICE MILITAIRE".

With the introduction of DEU, these accoutrements (except the brassards) were replaced.  Now the main identifying feature of the military police was the addition of the colour red: a red service cap band for Naval and Air Force personnel, a red beret for army MPs and red backing for the cap badges of air force and navy MPs.  In 2005, the dress regulations were amended to permit all MPs to wear the red beret regardless of their element, with any order of dress that may include a beret, except the number three order of dress for the Navy, in which the peaked cap is still worn, and the Air Force, in which case the Wedge is worn - both of which have a red identifier around the Military Police cap badge.

In 2001, the CF formally introduced the Military Police Operational Patrol Dress (MP OPD), a marked departure from standard military uniforms: it is immediately recognisable as a police uniform as opposed to a military one.  It consists of black trousers, short-sleeved shirts for summer wear, long-sleeved collared shirts for winter, the naval pattern sweater, patrol jacket, body armour, police equipment belt and MP Gore-Tex boots, with a red beret for all MPs.  It is normally authorised for wear on patrol duties only, by members up to and including the rank of Warrant Officer / Petty Officer 1st Class. Some units, however, have begun to dress all uniformed and badged MPs of all ranks (including those above Warrant Officer / Petty Officer 1st Class) and those outside of patrol duties, in MP OPD and accoutrements. This is to ensure that all MP are available at any time in the case of an Immediate Rapid Deployment (similar to the US SWAT) scenario.

Headdress
Headdress is worn with all orders of dress except mess dress. Cap badges are worn on most types of headdress, with the exception of winter tuques and operational headdress (which is not usually worn in public).

Ball caps

Ball caps embroidered with the name of the wearer's ship or unit are worn with naval combat dress. Air Force personnel may be authorized to wear squadron ball caps with CADPAT or flying suits when on the flight line or aboard ship as part of a ship's helicopter detachment.

Berets
The beret is still the most widely worn headgear, and is worn with almost all orders of dress with the exception of the more formal orders of Naval and Air Force dress (i.e. Ceremonial, Mess, and Service Dress). A regimental or branch cap badge is worn centred over the wearer's left eye, and excess material pulled to the wearer's right.

The colour of the beret is determined by the wearer's environment, branch, or mission. The beret colours listed below are the current standard:

History
Berets were first worn in the Canadian Army in 1937 when tank regiments (at that time part of the infantry) adopted the black beret of the Royal Armoured Corps. The black beret, which is now the headdress of the Royal Canadian Armoured Corps (RCAC), was first worn by the Essex Regiment (Tank), now renamed The Windsor Regiment (RCAC). This was because the other new tank units were ordered to wear the headdress that they had while serving as infantry. The Essex Regiment (Tank) was a new unit, formed as a tank regiment, with no connection to the Infantry. As such, it picked the headdress that was worn by the Royal Tank Corps of the British Army.

During the Second World War, a khaki beret was adopted throughout the Canadian Army, with the Canadian Armoured Corps (later Royal Canadian Armoured Corps) wearing the black beret and parachute troops wearing the maroon beret adopted by British airborne forces.  The 2nd Canadian Parachute Battalion (the Canadian component of the First Special Service Force) wore a red beret with the dress uniform. Wartime berets were much fuller in cut than postwar berets.

After the Second World War, a series of coloured berets were adopted, with infantry regiments wearing scarlet, rifle regiments wearing dark (rifle) green, the armoured corps wearing black, and other arms and services wearing midnight blue berets, with a large coloured "flash" in corps colours - dull cherry for the Royal Canadian Army Medical Corps, Emerald Green for the Royal Canadian Dental Corps, etc. The coloured flashes were not popular and replaced in 1956 with forage caps bearing coloured bands in corps colours.  The midnight blue beret itself was retained, however.

When the Canadian Forces unified on 1 February 1968, the rifle green beret was adopted as the CF standard.  The RCAC successfully fought to retain its distinctive black beret, and the Canadian Airborne Regiment wore the maroon beret until the unit was disbanded. Scottish and Irish infantry regiments wear Tam o' Shanters, glengarries, balmorals or caubeens instead of berets.

The beret is used in the Army with service dress as formal headdress (especially after the move away from the forage cap in the 1990s) as well as with CADPAT clothing as garrison dress and as a form of combat dress. Navy personnel wear the service cap and Air Force personnel the wedge cap with their service dress. In certain cases the beret is also used as Ceremonial Dress, most commonly in units of the Royal Canadian Armoured Corps.

Kilted regiments and pipe bands

The balmoral, caubeen, feather bonnet, glengarry, and tam o'shanters are worn by kilted regiments and pipe bands as part of their full dress or undress uniforms. Members of such units may also wear traditional headdress with service and operational dress.

Service cap and hat

The peaked cap (or female pattern service hat) is the only headdress authorized for wear with Navy ceremonial dress. It may also be worn with Navy service dress, though the beret is also allowed with Nos. 3A, 3B, and 3C. An army version of the peaked cap is worn by foot guard regiments of the Royal Canadian Infantry Corps. Peaked cap may also be optionally worn by Army general officers or CWOs who serve alongside them. The peaked cap was formerly worn by Air Force officers and Chief Warrant Officers, but has been discontinued in favour of the wedge cap.

Tuques
Tuques or muskrat fur Yukon caps are worn with overcoats or parkas in winter. No cap badges are worn.

Turbans

Turbans are worn with all orders of dress by Sikh members of the Canadian Armed Forces, although the unit commander retains the right to order for necessary adjustments should a conflict arise with operational safety. Cap badges are worn on the turban. Air Force and Army members are required to use the same colour turban as the colours used by their unit's berets; whereas members of the Navy wear white turbans when peaked caps are worn, and black turbans when berets are worn. Some units also add have ribbons based on their regimental colours, worn crossed behind the cap badge and tucked in at the back.

Wedge cap

The wedge cap is the only headdress authorized for wear with Air Force ceremonial dress. It is also worn with Air Force service dress and flying clothing, but not with CADPAT (the beret is also authorized for wear with these orders of dress).

A rifle green version, referred to as the field service cap, is worn by rifle regiments of the Royal Canadian Infantry Corps.

Regulations
Regulations for the wear of uniforms are contained in the CF publication Canadian Forces Dress Instructions. Amendments to dress regulations are issued through the office of the Vice Chief of the Defence Staff (VCDS), initially in the form of a CANFORGEN (Canadian Forces General) message, which is placed in the dress manual until an official publication amendment can be promulgated.

Dress regulations may also be amplified, interpreted, or amended by the commanders of formations and units (depending on the commander's authority) through the issuing of Standing Orders (SOs), Ship's Standing Orders (SSO), Routine Orders (ROs), and Standard Operating Procedures (SOPs). This may include amplification where the regulations are unclear or are not mandatory; amendments or reversal of some existing regulations for special occasions or events; or the promulgation of regulations regarding the wear of traditional regimental articles (such as kilts).

See also

 Canadian Armed Forces ranks and insignia
 Military uniform
 Uniforms of the Royal Canadian Navy

References

 A-AD-265-000/AG-001, Canadian Forces Dress Instructions.
 Dorosh, Michael A. Dressed to Kill (Service Publications, 2001).

External links
 Canadian Militia/Canadian Army/Canadian Armed Forces Uniforms
 The Whole Kit and Kaboodle Canadian Military Uniforms

uniforms
 
Military equipment of Canada